The Daytona Beach Police Department (DBPD) is the primary law enforcement agency for Daytona Beach, Florida. There are 241 sworn full-time police officers, 105 sworn part-time officers and 81 civilians on the force which is headed by Jakari Young who serves as Chief.

The main headquarters is located at 129 Valor Blvd. In January 2009, the former location at 990 Orange Ave was closed due to age (built in 1957 with additions in 1964 and 1971, and renovations in 1978) and its small size. Shortly after closing, in May 2009 the old headquarters was flooded along with large areas of the city after historic rains inundated Daytona. The former headquarters was demolished in late 2017 after a lengthy asbestos remediation process. A DBPD substation is located on Orange Ave across the street from the former headquarters location. Another DBPD substation is at the corner of Harvey and Wild Olive avenues on the "beachside", the peninsula portion of Daytona Beach on the east side of the Halifax River.

Scumbag Eradication Team
"Scumbag Eradication Team: Not in our Town!" are the words printed on a T-shirt used to raise money for the Daytona Beach Police Explorers Unit 22, a program which helps to mentor teenagers age 14–19 who are interested in a career in law enforcement.

The Police Explorers program is run by Learning for Life (LFL), a United States school and work-site based program that is a subsidiary of the Boy Scouts of America.

The T-shirts feature the words "Scumbag Eradication Team" and "Not In Our Town" with a caricature of former police chief Mike Chitwood, who served 17 years with the Philadelphia Police Department, and a
toilet full of what are assumed to be "scumbags". According to the DBPD website, "The purpose of the Daytona Beach Police Explorers Unit 22 is to assist the development of character in young people."

While some have questioned the propriety of selling T-shirts to children with the word "scumbag" on it, Chitwood had no qualms, saying "If somebody doesn't like the fact that I call them a scumbag, too bad."

Chitwood stated that the individuals he characterized as "scumbags" not only erode the quality of life in Daytona Beach but they also ruin its "fabric", saying "It's the scumbags like this that erode the quality of life and the fabric that we have here."

The T-shirt and its logo were cited in a $100,000 police brutality case filed by attorney Sam Masters who claimed the DBPD condones violent behavior. His client suffered broken ribs and a broken eye socket during an arrest. Chief Chitwood welcomed the lawsuit, saying "My suggestion to legal was you offer him one dollar and when he refuses, lets go to trial."

Prolific use of the word "scumbag" in public, as well as printing T-shirts which make prominent use of the word scumbag is a family tradition started in Pennsylvania by Chitwood's father, Mike Chitwood Sr., also a former officer of the Philadelphia Police. The elder Chitwood, later police chief of Upper Darby, Pennsylvania, printed "Not in My Town, Scumbag" on his shirts.

"Ride Along" program
The DBPD has a ride along program that offers civilians the opportunity to ride in the front seat of a real police car for a suggested donation of $250. According to the flier advertising the program "This ride-along isn't just tooling around, eating doughnuts and writing parking tickets." There are four different action-packed programs offered which vary in length from two to four hours. "Whether you choose to lock and load, cuff 'em and stuff 'em, or read 'em their rights, you will get your money's worth," the flier states.

Serial killer
Four unsolved homicides that occurred in December 2005, January 2006, February 2006 and December 2007 were linked to a single offender. A fifth unsolved death that occurred in October 2006 may have also been committed by the same offender. As of August 2011, the person or persons responsible for the murders, dubbed the Daytona Beach killer, has not been apprehended and the investigation is still open.

Controversies
Former police chief Michael Chitwood has been known for his brash language. In one incident, Chitwood referred to Volusia County Sheriff Ben Johnson as a "moron" during a public meeting. Ben Johnson said through a spokesman he would not dignify Chitwood's insult with a comment.
In 2012, patrol supervisor Jim Newcomb was promoted to the position of Captain. This promotion was met objections from the police union over his controversial past, which includes the wrongful firing of a lesbian officer and year-long harassment of another female officer.
On December 20, 2007 , Daytona Beach police officer Claudia Wright tasered Best Buy customer Elizabeth Beeland in front of a store full of customers. A store clerk had called police thinking Beeland was using a stolen credit card, which turned out not to be the case. Beeland was backing away from Wright when she was tasered. Police Chief Mike Chitwood defended his officer's actions. Wright was also investigated for interfering in a narcotics investigation in 2009. Wright was arrested in 2010 on three felony charges for fraud and forgery for allegedly defrauding her own grandmother.
After a heavily publicized incident on the campus of the historically black Bethune–Cookman University, in which DBPD Chief Chitwood was alleged to have made racist comments, the NAACP asked the US Attorney General, Eric Holder, to probe Chitwood’s "racially tinged" comments about the disturbance. A recent spate of murders in the black community, including the death of a 13-year-old boy who was shot in the face, have led some to blame the DBPD's moving the police headquarters from Orange Avenue, in the black community, to Valor Boulevard, in a culturally-mixed suburban area of Daytona Beach. When asked about the possibility of placing a police substation in the area, Chitwood responded that substations were "a monument for cops to sit on their ass and don’t do anything".
Lt. Major Garvin was fired after accusations of harassing employees of a local Starbucks. The officer agreed to take a polygraph, and the results tested negative. Garvin was fired for this incident, and then subsequently rehired based on an arbitrators ruling that the investigation into his behavior was "shoddy". He was involved in another incident in May 2010, involving parking his unmarked patrol car in a handicapped parking space at Disney's Wide World of Sports complex in Osceola County.

Killed in line of duty
Eight DBPD officers have been killed in the line of duty, five by gunfire, three by vehicular assault.
The most recent line of duty death was Police Officer Kevin John Fischer, a motorcycle officer, was struck and killed on September 4, 1998, by a pick-up truck on I-95, while aiding in an accident investigation of a prior incident.

Officer Fischer is buried at the Volusia Memorial Cemetery in Ormond Beach, Florida

See also
Fourth Amendment to the United States Constitution

References

External links
Daytona Beach Police Department (official website)

Municipal police departments of Florida
Daytona Beach, Florida